The 1969 South Pacific Games was the third games where football was played. The tournament was held at Port Moresby in Papua New Guinea during August 1969. In the final, New Caledonia scored in the 88th minute to defeat Tahiti 2–1 and claim the gold medal.

Round robin stage

Round 1

Round 2

Round 3

Round 4

Round 5

* Note: French Polynesia (Tahiti) forfeited the match as they were unable to field a team due to injuries to 11 of their 19-man squad.

Bronze medal match

Gold medal match

Sources

1969
Football at the Pacific Games
Pac
P
1969 Pacific Games